Danilo Nikolić (born 8 April 1993) is a Montenegrin professional basketball player for Avtodor Saratov of the VTB United League.

References

External links 
 Danilo Nikolić at aba-liga.com
 Danilo Nikolić at eurobasket.com
 Danilo Nikolić at euroleague.net

Living people
1993 births
ABA League players
Basketball League of Serbia players
Bilbao Basket players
JDA Dijon Basket players
KK Budućnost players
KK Lovćen players
KK Mega Basket players
Liga ACB players
Montenegrin expatriate basketball people in Serbia
Montenegrin expatriate basketball people in Spain
Montenegrin men's basketball players
Sportspeople from Podgorica
Power forwards (basketball)